Charles Ernest Chamberlain (July 22, 1917 – November 25, 2002) was a politician from the U.S. state of Michigan.

Life and career
Chamberlain was born in Locke Township, Michigan and after graduating from Lansing Central High School in Lansing, went on to earn a B.S. degree in 1941 from the University of Virginia in Charlottesville. He earned an LL.B. degree from the University of Virginia School of Law in 1949.

During World War II, Chamberlain served in the United States Coast Guard, 1942–1946, and afterward in the United States Coast Guard Reserve, 1946–1977. He worked as a lawyer in private practice and as an Internal Revenue Service agent in the United States Treasury Department, 1946–1947. He was assistant prosecutor for Ingham County, Michigan in 1950 and city attorney of East Lansing and legal counsel to the Michigan State Senate judiciary committee in 1953 and 1954. He was prosecuting attorney for Ingham County, 1955–1956.

In 1956, Chamberlain defeated incumbent Democrat Donald Hayworth to be elected as a Republican from Michigan's 6th congressional district to the Eighty-fifth Congress. He was re-elected to the eight succeeding Congresses, serving from January 3, 1957 until December 31, 1974. He only narrowly defeated Democrat Milton Robert Carr by 97,666 votes (50.68%) to 95,029 (49.32%) in what was otherwise a strong Republican year in 1972.  In 1974 he was succeeded by Carr. Chamberlain voted in favor of the Civil Rights Acts of 1957, 1960, 1964, and 1968, as well as the 24th Amendment to the U.S. Constitution and the Voting Rights Act of 1965.

Chamberlain died in Leesburg, Virginia of renal failure and congestive heart failure. He is interred in Evergreen Cemetery, Lansing, Michigan. He had been a member of the American Legion, the Society of the Cincinnati, Veterans of Foreign Wars, and Kiwanis.

References

The Political Graveyard

1917 births
2002 deaths
Politicians from Lansing, Michigan
University of Virginia alumni
University of Virginia School of Law alumni
Republican Party members of the United States House of Representatives from Michigan
20th-century American politicians